For the opera, see Natalka Poltavka (opera): For Ivan Kotlyarevsky's play, see Natalka Poltavka.

Natalka Poltavka is a 1936 Ukrainian feature film directed by Ivan Kavaleridze and shot by the Ukrainfilm studio. The film was remade in 1969 at the Dovzhenko Film Studios.  The film was based on the opera by Mykola Lysenko (1842—1912), based on the play of the same name by Ivan Kotlyarevsky. The film was then reshot in 1937 by Vasyl Avramenko, the first Ukrainian film produced in the United States, and again in 1978 under the direction of Rodion Yukhymenko. This new version was extended to 90 minutes.

History 
The opera was the first opera-based film for the Ukrainian film industry and the first Ukrainian sound film in which the actors sang "under the plywood" for the first time. On December 4, 1936, the film had its United States premiere.

Cast

Film Crew 
 Director and screenwriter: Ivan Kavaleridze
 Operators: G. Khimchenko, Fedir Kornev
 Artists: Mylitsa Simashkevich, Iunia Mayer
 Costume designer: Vera Kutynska
 Sound operators: O. Prakhov, Andriy Demydenko
 Music editor: Volodymyr Yorish
 Editing director: Tatyana Demitryukova
 Conductor: Mykhailo Kanerstein

Legacy 
On September 30,  2011, the Ukrainian state postal company Ukrposhta circulated artistic postage stamps printed with a hook from two stamps to immortalize the first film opera in Ukrainian art: "75 years. Film-opera "Natalka Poltavka" (No. 1132, No. 1133), an envelope "The First Day," and a special redemption stamp. The artist for the stamps was Larisa Melnyk. The materials for creating stamps were provided by the State Museum of Theater, Music and Film Arts of Ukraine. One of the postage stamps depicts the main character of the film, Natalka, played by actress Kateryna Osmyalovska. The second shows the key scene of the film, where the mother blesses Natalka and Peter for a life together.

Links 

 NATALKA POLTAVKA / Feature film / Film studio "Ukrainfilm" // 1936 (VIDEO)

References 
Soviet films based on plays
Films based on operas